Germany–Ukraine relations are foreign relations between Germany and Ukraine. Diplomatic relations between Ukraine and Germany originally were established in 1918 as between Ukrainian People's Republic and German Empire, but were discontinued soon thereafter due to occupation of Ukraine by the Red Army. Current relations were resumed in 1989 at a consulate level, and in 1992 as full-scale diplomatic mission. Germany supports Ukraine's European Union and NATO membership.

History

1918–1990
In 1918, in the aftermath of the Brest-Litovsk Treaty, German troops provided military assistance to Ukraine against Soviet Russia. The German military administration was instrumental in Pavlo Skoropadskyi coup against the Ukrainian People's Republic (April 1918) and the establishment of the short-lived Ukrainian State. The first German Ambassador to Ukraine was Alfons Mumm von Schwarzenstein, whereas the first Ukrainian Ambassador to Germany was Oleksandr Sevriuk (as Chargé d'affaires) who was replaced with Teodor Shteingel.

During World War II, German troops (with the help of Italians, Romanians, and Hungarians) occupied most of Soviet Ukraine (including Soviet-occupied southeastern Poland) from 1941 to 1944, portioning the territory between the General Government and Reichskommissariat Ukraine. OUN's Ukrainian Insurgent Army alternated between fighting the Germans and accepting their help against the Soviets. Herbert Backe formulated the Hunger Plan, intended to conduct large-scale confiscation of Ukrainian agricultural crops to feed the German military and civilians, and at the same time deliberately starve a sizeable portion of the Ukrainian population. Although it was not fully implemented, part of the population of Kyiv and Kharkiv was starved to death. The German Generalplan Ost anticipated mass expulsion of the population and German colonization in accordance with the Lebensraum policy.

Following the war, from 1944 to the 1950s, surviving OUN leaders found refuge in the US occupation zone of Germany, which became home to many Ukrainian displaced persons. In 1953, Radio Free Europe/Radio Liberty (then called "Radio Liberation") started its operations in Munich, broadcasting to Ukraine in Ukrainian language. In 1959, Stepan Bandera was killed in Munich by a Soviet agent.

1990–2014
In 1991, Germany opposed Ukrainian independence and the dissolution of the Soviet Union, according to archived German Foreign Ministry files released in 2022. In November 1991, facing the imminent dissolution of the Soviet Union, German Chancellor Helmut Kohl offered Russia to "exert influence on the Ukrainian leadership" for it to join a proposed confederation with Russia. Germany changed its stance only when Ukrainian independence became inevitable after the independence referendum held in December 1991, and then recognized Ukraine.

In 2011, the Nord Stream 1 made Ukraine economically vulnerable.

During Russian-Ukrainian wars 

 
In 2014, Germany was part of the Normandy format discussions aimed at halting the invasion of Ukraine by Russia. Germany stopped all sales of weapons to Ukraine, officially due to the long-standing policy of never sending weapons to conflict zones. The German Ostpolitik policy was dramatically shaken after 2014 as Russia threatened Ukraine, seized Crimea, and sponsored fighting in eastern Ukraine. Berlin denounced Moscow's actions as a violation of international law, and took a leadership role in formulating EU sanctions. However, Germany depends heavily on Russian energy supplies via the Nord Stream pipeline, so it has proceeded cautiously and opposed American efforts to cancel Nord Stream.

In July 2018, the planned Nord Stream 2 gas pipeline from Russia to Germany was opposed by Ukrainian President Petro Poroshenko.

In December 2021, Germany blocked arms supplies to Ukraine during the 2021–2022 Russo-Ukrainian crisis. In January 2022, Ukraine's foreign minister Dmytro Kuleba criticises the German governments for upholding the long-standing policy of not sending weapons into conflict regions. Germany had stopped such exports to Ukraine in 2014. He stressed that while he respects Germany's reasoning for upholding their policy in reference to their past he "could not agree to it". Also in January, the German ambassador to Ukraine Anka Feldhusen was summoned to Ukraine's foreign ministry over comments by German navy chief Kay-Achim Schönbach; vice admiral Schönbach resigned as a result. Germany offered 5,000 helmets to Ukraine. The offer was ridiculed and the transfer was delayed. In February, Annalena Baerbock as a representative of Germany's foreign ministry requested German citizens to urgently leave Ukraine as Russia poised to invade Ukraine, Furthermore, after G7 meeting, she assured the united support by the group for Ukraine.

On February 26, Germany abandoned a long-standing policy of never sending weapons to conflict zones; it increased its support for Ukraine's fight against Russia, approving arms transfers to Kyiv in a policy reversal and agreeing to block Moscow's access to the SWIFT interbank system. In April 2022, Ukraine rejected a request for an official visit by German President Frank-Walter Steinmeier who is widely perceived in Ukraine as being pro-Russian owing to his support for Nord Stream 2 and past comments accusing NATO of "warmongering". 

In April 2022, Germany committed to sending armored anti-aircraft systems and armored vehicles to Ukraine. The first three Flakpanzer Gepard arrived in Ukraine on 25 July 2022. Thirty Gepards were delievered until 20 September 2022. In May 2022, the German government committed to send seven PzH 2000 artillery pieces to Ukraine, with five more from the Dutch government. Ukrainian troops arrived in Germany five days later for training and the Ukrainian government subsequently placed an order to purchase a further 100 PzH 2000 howitzers from Germany. In January 2023, the German government resisted pressure from its NATO allies, especially the United States and Poland, to agree to provide Leopard 2 battle tanks to Ukraine, however it eventually agreed to send the tanks and also allowed Poland to send its Leopard 2 tanks.

Diplomatic missions location
Germany has an embassy in Kyiv and 1 Consulate-General in Donetsk (due to Russian aggression (War in Donbass) temporarily in Dnipro).

Ukraine has an embassy in Berlin and 3 Consulates-General in Frankfurt, Hamburg and Munich.

Head of missions (1917-1920s)
Germany
 1917-18 Alfons Mumm von Schwarzenstein
 1918-19 Johannes (Hans) Graf von Berchem

Ukraine
 1918-18 Oleksandr Sevriuk (chargé d'affaires)
 1918-18 Omelian Koziy (chargé d'affaires)
 1918-18 Teodor Shteingel
 1918-20 Mykola Porsh
 1921-23 Roman Smal-Stocki
 1923-23 Nikolaus von Wassilko (chargé d'affaires)

Soviets (representative of the Soviet government in Ukraine)
 1921-23 Voldemar Aussem

Resident diplomatic missions 
 Germany has an embassy in Kyiv.
 Ukraine has an embassy in Berlin and consulates-general in Frankfurt, Düsseldorf, Hamburg and Munich.

See also 
 WW2, Germans in Ukraine
 Gazprom
 Gerhard Schroeder
Cold War, Cold War II
 Russian-Ukrainian wars
Ukraine–EU relations, Ukrainians in Germany, Ukrainian diaspora
 Accession of Ukraine to the European Union

References

Further reading
 Dembińska, Magdalena, and Frederic Mérand, eds. Cooperation and Conflict between Europe and Russia (Routledge, 2021).
 Fix, Liana. "The different ‘shades’ of German power: Germany and EU foreign policy during the Ukraine Conflict." German Politics 27.4 (2018): 498-515. online
 Siddi, Marfco. "German foreign policy towards Russia in the aftermath of the Ukraine crisis: A new Ostpolitik?." Europe-Asia Studies 68.4 (2016): 665-677.

External links 
  German Foreign Ministry about relations with Ukraine
  German embassy in Ukarianian capital Kyiv (in German and Ukrainian language)
  Ukrainian embassy in Berlin (in German and Ukrainian language)

Ukraine
Bilateral relations of Ukraine